Ghent station may refer to:

 Gent-Sint-Pieters railway station, the main railway station in Ghent, Belgium
 Gent-Dampoort railway station, a smaller station in Ghent, Belgium
 Ghent (NYCRR station), a former railroad station in Ghent, New York
 Ghent Generating Station, a power plant in Kentucky, United States